Henry van Lyck (born Rüdiger Leberecht; 15 January 1941 in Cologne, Germany) is a German actor.

Selected filmography
 Freddy and the Millionaire (1961)
 Snow White and the Seven Jugglers (1962)
  (1965, TV miniseries)
 Go for It, Baby (1968)
 Signs of Life (1968)
  (24 Hour Lover, 1968)
  (1969)
 Student of the Bedroom (1970)
 Don't Fumble, Darling (1970)
 Red Sun (1970)
 Die tollkühnen Penner (1971)
 Zu dumm zum... (1971) (also director)
  (1974)
 The Enigma of Kaspar Hauser (1974)
 Tour de Ruhr (1981, TV miniseries)
  (1983)
 Derrick - Season 12, Episode 6: "Das tödliche Schweigen" (1985)
 The Aggression (1988)
 Ein Schloß am Wörthersee (1991–1993, TV series)

External links

ZBF Agency Munich 

1941 births
Living people
German male television actors
German male film actors
20th-century German male actors
21st-century German male actors
Actors from Cologne